Rancheria Creek may refer to:

Rancheria Creek (Tuolumne County, California), a stream in California
Rancheria Creek (Big Butte Creek tributary), a stream in Oregon

See also
 Rancheria River (disambiguation)
 Rancheria (disambiguation)